WFAA Communications Center Studios are the main studio operations for Tegna, Inc. owned television stations WFAA, an ABC affiliate, and KMPX, an Estrella TV affiliate; located at 606 Young Street in Dallas, Texas. WFAA and Nexstar Media Group-owned CW affiliate KDAF are the only two stations in the Dallas-Fort Worth broadcasting market not owned-and-operated by their respective parent companies. The studio opened in 1961, and housed WFAA-TV, WFAA-AM, and WFAA-FM, later known as KZEW-FM. From 1938 to 1970, WFAA-AM was both an NBC and ABC station which meant that the building housed both the NBC and ABC networks. The station that WFAA shared networks with was WBAP-AM which was housed at Broadcast Hill in Fort Worth. In the early years, WFAA was more known to Dallas and WBAP was more known to Fort Worth. WFAA-TV played a strong part in youthful programs such as Sump'n Else, The Group And Chapman, Peppermint Place, and many others. During the 1960s, WFAA-AM continued to broadcast entertainment, but its ratings were weakened due to Top 40 station KLIF-AM's format. The KLIF Triangle Point Studios are located a few blocks from WFAA in Downtown Dallas. WFAA Studios are a major part of Dallas-Fort Worth broadcasting history. At one time, Downtown Dallas had three different broadcast headquarters, which are WFAA, KRLD, and KLIF. While many national television shows were on tour, they occasionally filmed a few segments at WFAA Studios.

Buildings and structures in Dallas
Tegna Inc.
Television studios in the United States